Makpetrol is the leading distributor of largest oil companies and oil products in North Macedonia. The company was founded in 1947 as Jugopetrol-Skopje, employing 85 individuals. Today, Makpetrol is one of the biggest companies of North Macedonia and celebrated its sixtieth anniversary in 2007. Revenue of Makpetrol is 402 million euros in 2013. The company has 117 gas stations and its headquarters is in Skopje, the capital of North Macedonia.

External links
Makpetrol official site

References 
Oil companies of North Macedonia
Companies based in Skopje
Energy companies established in 1947